Alone Aboard the Ark is the third studio album by English indie band The Leisure Society, released in April 2013 by record label Full Time Hobby. The album was recorded at The Kinks frontman, Ray Davies, studio Konk.

Track list

Personnel 
 Nick Hemming - vocals, autoharp, banjo, bass, chromatic harmonica, dobro, acoustic guitar, classical guitar, electric guitar, handclapping, mellotron, mixing, percussion, upright piano, producer
 Christian Hardy - fender rhodes, electric guitar, handclapping, harmonium, mixing, omnichord, hammond organ, percussion, electric piano, upright piano, producer, synthesizer, vocals
 Darren Bonehill - bass
 Sebastian Hankins - drums, electronic drums, handclapping, percussion, vocals
 Mike Siddell - banjo, brass arrangement, glockenspiel, electric guitar, handclapping, mandolin, orchestral arrangements, string arrangements, violin, vocals
 Helen Whitaker - flute, alto flute, handclapping, orchestral arrangements, synthesizer, vocals
 Josephine Aniyama - background vocals
 Daniel Broncano - clarinet, bass clarinet
 Nick Etwell - trumpet
 Jamie Hutchinson - violin
 Tom Leaper - clarinet, alto saxophone, soprano saxophone, tenor saxophone
 Ben Thigg - cello
 Dave Williamson - trombone
 Dougal Lott - engineer, mixing, producer
 Jonas Persson - engineer
 Robin Schmidt - mastering
 Josh Green - assistant engineer
 Owen Davey - artwork, layout

References

2013 albums
The Leisure Society albums
Full Time Hobby albums